Raymond MacDonald is a saxophonist, composer and psychologist with an extensive career in music, cross-disciplinary arts and academia. Much of his work explores the boundaries and ambiguities between what is conventionally seen as improvisation and composition. As a saxophonist and composer, MacDonald has released over 60 CDs, toured and broadcast worldwide and has composed music for film, television, theatre, radio and art installations. He is currently Professor of Music Psychology and Improvisation at Edinburgh University and his recent book, The Art of Becoming: How Group Improvisation Works (co-authored with Graeme Wilson) explores the nature of improvisation. MacDonald has also co-edited five texts and published over 80 academic papers and book chapters.

Early life and education
MacDonald was born in Glasgow (Scotland) to a family steeped in the arts (his father Hamish MacDonald was a renowned contemporary artist) and studied at Glasgow University, where he obtained a PhD in psychology studying the therapeutic effects of music for individuals with learning difficulties. After completing his PhD, MacDonald worked as artistic director for Limelight, a music production company specialising in training and developmental opportunities for people with impairments.

Career as a musician
MacDonald’s work is informed by a view of improvisation as a social, collaborative and uniquely creative process that provides opportunities to develop new ways of engaging musically. He plays in many collaborative free improvisatory contexts, and his roots in jazz and pop music can be heard across all areas of his performance and composition. His unique approach of combining music and psychology and incorporating other artistic disciplines has been used to develop collaborative projects and ongoing working relationships around the world. He began his performing career playing guitar in Remember Fun, as part of the indie scene in Glasgow in the late 1980s and moved into jazz playing with saxophone quartet The Hung Drawn Quartet and a jazz trio, Another Hairdo.  

MacDonald has collaborated with musicians across the spectrum of international contemporary music, such as Marilyn Crispell (US), George Lewis (US), David Byrne (UK/US), Jim O’Rourke (US), Damo Suzuki (JP/DE), Kang Tae Hwan (KR), Axel Dorner (DE), Tatsuya Nakatani (JP), Tony Buck (AU), Michael Zerang (US), Fred Lonberg-Holm (US) Satoko Fujii (JP) and Natsuki Tamura (JP). His list of UK collaborators is equally extensive, and includes Evan Parker, Nurse with Wound, Fred Frith, Keith Tippett, Barry Guy, Harry Beckett, Keith Rowe, Lol Coxhill, Maggie Nicols, Steve Noble, Steve Beresford, the London Improvisers Orchestra (LIO), and Future Pilot A.K.A. He is a founding member of the Glasgow Improvisers Orchestra (GIO) and co-leads the George Burt-Raymond MacDonald Quartet.  He plays with Alister Spence and Sia Xray in Sensaround and has long standing duo partnerships with Marilyn Crispel and Gunter “Baby” Sommer.

MacDonald instigates and collaborates on cross-disciplinary projects and has worked with visual artists, dancers, writers and filmmakers. Cross-disciplinary projects include collaborations with Christine Borland, Simon Starling, Martin Boyce, Douglas Copland, a BBC Radio 3 commission Between the Ears for Burt-MacDonald Quintet (BMacD5), and an ongoing collaboration Scarecrows & Lighthouses with Boyce and David Mackenzie. MacDonald has also worked with Mackenzie on film soundtracks, including Young Adam (2003), Outlaw King (2018) and short film What is Essential? that debuted on Netflix as part of their anthology series Homemade, (2020). Other contributions to music for film and TV include soundtracks for Nicolas Winding Refn's Valhalla Rising (2010), and Scottish Television series Taggert.

Selected collaborative projects 

 This is not improvised but that is: Lockdown 2020 (2020), with daughters Eva and Maria. Broadcast as part of Improvfest 2020, hosted International Institute for Critical Studies in Improvisation, Guelph, Canada. 
Theatre of the Home (2021), with Maria Sappho
 Duet for two people who have never met (2020), with Rachel Joy Weiss.
Return to Y'Hup: The world of Ivor Cutler (2020), a reimagining of the first release by Scottish poet and composer Ivor Cutler. Co-created with Matt Brennan and Malcolm Benzie.
 Still My Sleepy Fortunes (2019), new work commissioned by Creative Scotland to mark the centenary of Scottish writer Muriel Spark.
 Silent Music | Seeing Sound (2019), exhibition of graphic scores at The Royal Scottish Academy with ongoing collaborator Jo Ganter (visual artist and print maker).   
Together (2017), a new score commissioned by PRS Foundation with musician Christian Ferlaino for Lorenza Mazzetti's 1956 silent film.
Glasgow Improvisers Orchestra, founding member (2002 - present)
Guitar and Saxophone duo with musician Jer Reid

Discography

Albums

Academic career
Between 2000-2012, MacDonald worked in the Psychology Department at Glasgow Caledonian University where he led the Glasgow Caledonian Music Psychology Research Group.  Since 2012 he has held the position of Professor of Music Psychology and Improvisation at Edinburgh University and was Head of The School of Music between 2013 and 2016.  He was editor of the journal Psychology of Music between 2006 and 2012.  He runs workshops and lectures internationally on issues relating to composition, improvisation, music education, health and wellbeing  and musical communication.

Publications

Books 

 MacDonald, R. and Wilson, G. (2020), The Art of Becoming: How Group Improvisation Works New York: Oxford University Press.

Edited books 

 MacDonald R.A.R, Miell D & Hargreaves D.J.  EDS (2017), The Oxford Handbook of Musical Identities Oxford: Oxford University Press.
 MacDonald R.A.R, &. Kreutz, G Mitchell, L.A., EDS (2012),  Music, Health and Wellbeing Oxford: Oxford University Press.
 Hargreaves D.J.  Miell D & MacDonald R.A.R, EDS (2012), Musical Imaginations Oxford: Oxford University Press.
 Miell, D. MacDonald R.A.R, & Hargreaves D.J. EDS (2005), Musical Communication Oxford: Oxford University Press.
 MacDonald R.A.R, Miell D & Hargreaves D.J.  EDS (2002), Musical Identities Oxford: Oxford University Press.

Selected refereed journal articles & book chapters 

 MacDonald, R.A.R , Burke, R.L.  De Nora , T, Sappho Donohue, M. and Birrell, R. (2021)  Our Virtual Tribe: Sustaining and Enhancing Community via Online Music Improvisation Frontiers in Psychology.
 MacDonald, R.A.R. and Birrell, R. (2021) Flattening the curve: Glasgow Improvisers Orchestra’s use of virtual improvising to maintain community during COVID-19 pandemic. Critical Studies in Improvisation.
 MacGlone, U. M.; Vamvakaris, J.; Wilson, G. B. & MacDonald, R. A. R. (2020) ‘Understanding the effects of a community music programme for people with disabilities: a mixed-methods, person-centred study’. Frontiers in Psychology.

References

External links
 (for recording work)

1967 births
Living people
Academics of the University of Edinburgh
British male saxophonists
Alumni of the University of Glasgow
FMR Records artists